Heinrich H. Riffarth (1860 – 21 January 1908) was a German entomologist who specialised in Lepidoptera.

He was an entrepreneur. The Riffarth collection of Heliconiidae was sold to James John Joicey, his  Agrias specimens were sold to the Natural History Museum at Tring. The remaining exotic butterflies went to Hermann Rolle.

Works
Publications include:
 Riffarth, H. 1901 Die Gattung Heliconius Latr.: Neu bearbeitet und Beschreibung neuer Formen. Berl. Entomol. Zeit. 46, 25–183.
 with Hans Stichel Das Tierreich 22 : Lepidoptera, Heliconiidae. Berlin : Friedländer, 1905.

References
 Gaedecke, R. and Groll, E. K. (Hrsg.): Biografien der Entomologen der Welt : Datenbank. Version 4.15 : Senckenberg Deutsches Entomologisches Institut, 2010

External links
 

German lepidopterists
1908 deaths
1860 births